Niobrara (Omaha: Ní Ubthátha Tʰáⁿwaⁿgthaⁿ , meaning "water spread-out village") is a village in Knox County, Nebraska, United States. The population was 363 at the 2020 census.

History
Niobrara was founded in 1856, when a group of men headed by a Dr. Benneville Yeakel Shelly marked their claim to an area on the banks of the Missouri River. There, a fort was built to protect the early settlers from Indian attacks. The settlement took its name from the Niobrara River.

They built a log garrison of cottonwood, which later became known as "Old Cabin". The company, founded by Shelly and others, was called L'eau Qui Court Company. This Company failed, and the Niobrara Township Company was organized. The new town was eventually called "Niobrara", an Omaha word for "running water". On June 29, 1857, a steam sawmill was brought to Niobrara from St. Louis by the steamer "Omaha" and was immediately put into operation sawing lumber for the building of the new town. In spite of early hardships, the new town continued to grow, and the 1881 population was reported to be about 500. Just as the Missouri River was responsible for the original settlement of Niobrara, it was also responsible for the first move. In March 1881, the spring thaw produced one of the largest Missouri River floods on record. After the danger of flooding, Mother Nature and the mighty Missouri again invaded Niobrara in April 1952, and much of the town and the surrounding area was flooded. This record flow came shortly before the completion of the Missouri River dams, citizens were relieved that flooding along the Missouri would be a thing of the past and life could continue at a more or less routine pace. A big event of the 1950s was the Centennial Celebration of June 16–17, 1956. There were many events leading up to the two day celebration which was attended by an estimated 20,000 people. Later, in the 1950s and in the 1960s, it became apparent that the mighty Missouri would, again, influence Niobrara history. Silt from the Niobrara River, which began to accumulate in the river bed, raised the ground water level in Niobrara and the surrounding area. Many basements became flooded, requiring constant pumping and it was apparent that the problem would continue to intensify. By 1969, community officials began to look for solutions. The US Army Corps of having seemingly passed, on March 28, 1881, an ice gorge broke and Niobrara residents were greeted by a surge of muddy water. The water continued to overflow until most of the town was covered, forcing people and animals alike to seek the safety of higher ground. Fortunately, there were no deaths but this disastrous flood influenced the citizens of Niobrara to pick up and move to a new town site west and south of the old site. The town grew and flourished at the new location providing most of the goods and services required by a rural Nebraska community of that era. Noteworthy events of the era included the first school house in 1886, the first waterworks system which was supplied by an artesian well completed in 1892, the construction of an electric light plant in 1899 and the coming of the railroad in 1902. 1902 also marked the moving of the county seat from Niobrara to a new central location in the newly formed town of Center.Through most of Niobrara's history, ferry boats have provided an important transportation link with South Dakota. The first ferry boat began operation in about 1860 and was operated by horses walking on a treadmill.1910 marked the grand opening of the Niobrara Island Park. The land on which the park was built was given to the village for a park in 1881 by the U.S. Department of the Interior. The village operated the park until approximately 1930 when it was given to the State of Nebraska and was added to the Nebraska Park System. Engineers became involved and eventually suggested three solutions. These included abandonment of the town, an elaborate dike and pumping system, or relocation to a new site. Niobrara citizens accepted the challenge of, once again, moving Niobrara and the site selection process followed. Funds were appropriated by Congress to pay a sizable portion of the cost of the move. Site preparation began in September 1973 and was completed in April 1974. Next came the water, sewer, storm sewer, paving, water wells and water storage tank. The sale of residential lots followed  in the summer of 1974 and residential construction moved forward at a fast pace. By the end of 1977, the move was nearly completed. The 1980 census showed 420 and 213 homes in Niobrara. 1981 marked the 112th anniversary of the original settlement and was celebrated with a historical pageant, parade and other activities. Through volunteer efforts, a nine-hole grass greens golf course was completed on the old town site. The Niobrara State Park was relocated, suffering the same fate as the old town. Niobrara's history can best be summarized as being destined by the mighty Missouri on whose banks it was founded and from whose reach it has continuously tried to escape.

Geography
Niobrara is located at  (42.750000, -98.031989). Nebraska highways 12 and 14 run through the village, Highway 14 connects Nebraska with South Dakota via the Chief Standing Bear Memorial Bridge, just east of the village across the Missouri River.

The Niobrara River, which is right next to the town, actually courses through the Mormon Canal rather than its original riverbed.

Demographics

2010 census
At the 2010 census there were 370 people, 193 households, and 93 families in the village. The racial makeup of the village was 84.3% White, 0.3% African American, 11.6% Native American, and 3.8% from two or more races. Hispanic or Latino of any race were 2.4%.

Of the 193 households 15.0% had children under the age of 18 living with them, 37.3% were married couples living together, 7.3% had a female householder with no husband present, 3.6% had a male householder with no wife present, and 51.8% were non-families. 45.6% of households were one person and 23.3% were one person aged 65 or older. The average household size was 1.92 and the average family size was 2.70.

The median age in the village was 54.8 years. 16.8% of residents were under the age of 18; 4.5% were between the ages of 18 and 24; 17.1% were from 25 to 44; 32.4% were from 45 to 64; and 29.2% were 65 or older. The gender makeup of the village was 51.4% male and 48.6% female.

2000 census
At the 2000 census there were 379 people, 184 households, and 107 families in the village. The population density was 525.2 people per square mile (203.2/km). There were 230 housing units at an average density of 318.7 per square mile (123.3/km).  The racial makeup of the village was 86.54% White, 10.29% Native American, 0.53% Pacific Islander, 0.53% from other races, and 2.11% from two or more races. Hispanic or Latino of any race were 2.37%.

Of the 184 households 22.8% had children under the age of 18 living with them, 46.7% were married couples living together, 8.2% had a female householder with no husband present, and 41.8% were non-families. 39.7% of households were one person and 22.8% were one person aged 65 or older. The average household size was 2.06 and the average family size was 2.72.

The age distribution was 22.7% under the age of 18, 3.4% from 18 to 24, 17.9% from 25 to 44, 32.2% from 45 to 64, and 23.7% 65 or older. The median age was 49 years. For every 100 females, there were 103.8 males. For every 100 females age 18 and over, there were 98.0 males.

The median household income was $26,000, and the median family income  was $36,250. Males had a median income of $26,042 versus $21,250 for females. The per capita income for the village was $15,299. About 9.3% of families and 13.8% of the population were below the poverty line, including 28.4% of those under age 18 and 7.4% of those age 65 or over.

Climate
This climatic region is typified by large seasonal temperature differences, with warm to hot (and often humid) summers and cold (sometimes severely cold) winters.  According to the Köppen Climate Classification system, Niobrara has a humid continental climate, abbreviated "Dfa" on climate maps.

Notable people
Anton Krupicka, ultrarunner
James Tufts, acting governor of Montana Territory

See also 
Lewis and Clark Lake
Niobrara State Park
Niobrara Reservation
 – memorial to the three Sage brothers

References

External links
 Official website

Villages in Knox County, Nebraska
Villages in Nebraska
Seats of government of American Indian reservations
Populated places established in 1856
Nebraska populated places on the Missouri River
1856 establishments in Nebraska Territory